Tamarine Tanasugarn and Zhang Shuai were the defending champions, but Tanasugarn chose not to participate.  Zhang played alongside Yaroslava Shvedova, but lost in the first round to Tímea Babos and Olga Govortsova. First seeded Hsieh Su-wei and Peng Shuai won the title, defeating in the final 3rd seeded Vania King and Galina Voskoboeva with the score 6–3, 4–6, [12–10].

Seeds

Draw

Draw

References
Main Draw

Guangzhou International Women's Open Doubles
2013 Doubles
Guangzhou International Women's Open Doubles